DYTM-TV, channel 2, is a television station of Philippine television network Intercontinental Broadcasting Corporation. Its studios and transmitter are located in Brgy. Calindagan, Dumaguete, Negros Oriental. This station is currently inactive.

See also
 List of Intercontinental Broadcasting Corporation channels and stations

Intercontinental Broadcasting Corporation stations
Television stations in Negros Oriental
Television channels and stations established in 1998